Číčov is a village and municipality in the Komárno District in the Nitra Region of south-west Slovakia.

Geography 
The village lies at an altitude of 113 metres and covers an area of 29.503 km2.
It has a population of about 1,360 people.

History 
In the 9th century, the territory of Číčov became part of the Kingdom of Hungary. The village was first mentioned in 1172 as Chichou. In 1268 belonged to Komárom fortress, later it was the property of the Counts  Pálffy, Zichy and Kálnoky. In 1682, as a result of the Counter-Reformation the local Calvinist church was banned. In the early 18th century the residents of the village supported the Francis II Rákóczi's uprising. The Treaty of Trianon assigned Číčov to Czechoslovakia, in spite of the village's Hungarian majority. In 1938 following the First Vienna Arbitration it was reannexed by Hungary, but lost again after the end of World War II.

Ethnicity 
The village is about 91% Hungarian, 9% Slovak.

Facilities 
The village has a public library a gym and a  football pitch.

Genealogical resources

The records for genealogical research are available at the state archive "Statny Archiv in Bratislava, Nitra, Slovakia"

 Roman Catholic church records (births/marriages/deaths): 1724-1910 (parish A)
 Reformated church records (births/marriages/deaths): 1784-1933 (parish A)

See also
 List of municipalities and towns in Slovakia

References

External links 
Official website
Old pictures and descriptions of Csicsó and its inhabitants  - in Hungarian
Jewish families in Csicsó - Číčov until Holocaust
Surnames of living people in Číčov

Villages and municipalities in the Komárno District
Hungarian communities in Slovakia